Acronicta impleta, the yellow-haired dagger moth, is a moth of the family Noctuidae. It is found in most of North America.

The wingspan is about 42 mm. Adults are on wing from April to July depending on the location.

The larvae feed on Ulmus, Acer, Betula, Salix and Quercus species.

Subspecies
Acronicta impleta impleta
Acronicta impleta illita

Gallery

External links
Images
Bug Guide

Acronicta
Moths of North America
Moths described in 1856